The seventeenth series of British reality television series The Apprentice (UK) premiered on 5 January 2023 in the UK on BBC One. Karren Brady and Tim Campbell will return as Alan Sugar's aides, the latter of whom will join the show on a permanent basis, after stepping in for Claude Littner in the previous series. Littner will also return to the series but in a "reduced role" and will only appear in two episodes. Eighteen candidates are set to compete in the series, the highest number of candidates since the thirteenth series. The first trailer for the series was released on 20 December 2022. The candidates were revealed on 3 January 2023, two days before the show's premiere.

The series is the first to feature two candidates leaving the competition of their own accord. Shannon Martin resigned in Episode 2, while Reece Donnelly left at some point during Episode 6.  This is the second consecutive series with only women present at the interviews stage, and the fourth consecutive series with two women in the final.

Series overview

Candidates

Performance chart

 The candidate won this series of The Apprentice.
 The candidate was the runner-up.
 The candidate won as project manager on his/her team, for this task.
 The candidate lost as project manager on his/her team, for this task.
 The candidate was on the winning team for this task / they passed the Interviews stage.
 The candidate was on the losing team for this task.
 The candidate was brought to the final boardroom for this task.
 The candidate was fired in this task.
 The candidate lost as project manager for this task and was fired.
 The candidate left the process.

Episodes

References

External links

 The Apprentice Series 17

The Apprentice (British TV series) seasons
2023 British television seasons